The Papua New Guinea women's national volleyball team represents Papua New Guinea in international women's volleyball competitions and friendly matches.

The team appeared at the Pacific Games several times.

References
Papua New Guinea Volleyball Federation

National women's volleyball teams
Volleyball
Volleyball in Papua New Guinea
Women's sport in Papua New Guinea